
Orphanage were a death metal/gothic metal band from the Netherlands.

History 
The band was formed in 1993 and released their first demos Morph (1993) and Druid (1994). Orphanage then recorded their first full album Oblivion (1995) and one year later released their second album, By Time Alone. In 1997, the band released the EP At The Mountains Of Madness and worked three years on the album Inside, which was released in 2000. The last album Driven was released in 2004. On 18 October 2005 the band announced that they had disbanded. All 4 full albums were released  on the Nuclear Blast and DSFA labels.

Line-up 

Final line-up
George Oosthoek – harsh vocals (1994–2005)
Rosan van der Aa – clean vocals (1995–2005)
Theo Holsheimer – guitars (2004–2005)
Marcel Verdurmen – guitars (2004–2005)
Guus Eikens – keyboards (1993–2000, 2004–2005), guitar (2000–2004)
Remko van der Spek – bass (2000–2005)
Sureel – drums (2000–2005)

Former members
Jason Köhnen – harsh vocals (1993)
Stefan Ruiters – clean vocals (1993)
Martine van Loon – clean vocals (1994–1995)
Lex Vogelaar – guitars (1993–2000)
Lasse Dellbrügge – keyboards (2000–2004)
Eric Hoogendoorn – bass (1993–2000)
Stephen van Haestregt – drums (1993–1994)
Jules Vleugels – drums (1995)
Erwin Polderman – drums (1995–2000)

Timeline

Discography 
Demos
 Morph (1993)
 Druid (1994)
Albums
 Oblivion (1995)
 By Time Alone (1996)
 Inside (2000)
 Driven (2004)
EP's
 At The Mountains Of Madness (EP) (1997)
 The Sign Tour EP (2003)

References

External links 
Orphanage at metal-archives.com

Dutch heavy metal musical groups
Dutch death metal musical groups
Dutch musical groups
Musical groups established in 1993
Musical groups disestablished in 2005
Dutch gothic metal musical groups
Nuclear Blast artists
1993 establishments in the Netherlands